Crabtree is a suburb of Plymouth in the English county of Devon.

Originally, it was a small village beside the coaching route around the top of the Plym Estuary where travellers stopped before or after crossing the marshland known as Marsh Mills and the road to Plympton then Exeter and London. Now it is part of the city of Plymouth and has been substantially overbuilt by a superstore, one of the largest roundabouts in the west of England, and a flyover carrying the A38 road. There is now a travel lodge and small housing estate.

Various other hamlets also formerly stood on or near the site including 'Longbridge'. The city museum and art gallery collection, the National Trust at nearby Saltram House and various private collections own paintings and water colours of the old Crabtree at the head of the estuary which was once evidently one of the most attractive views in the area.

Suburbs of Plymouth, Devon
Villages in Devon